Xining Subdistrict  is a subdistrict situated in Longshan District, Liaoyuan, Jilin, China.

See also
List of township-level divisions of Jilin

References

Township-level divisions of Jilin
Liaoyuan